Around may refer to:

 "Around" (song), by Julia van Bergen
 Around, 2006 album by Tom Verlaine
 Around, 2013 EP by Whirr
 Around, 2006 Palestinian film

See also
 Round (disambiguation)